Hague Convention may refer to: 

Hague Conventions of 1899 and 1907, among the first formal statements of the laws of war and war crimes in international law, signed July 1899 and October 1907
International Opium Convention, the first international drug control treaty, sometimes referred to as the Hague Convention of 1912, signed January 1912
League of Nations Codification Conference, 1930
Convention on Certain Questions Relating to the Conflict of Nationality Laws, 1930
Hague Convention for the Protection of Cultural Property in the Event of Armed Conflict, signed May 1954
Convention for the Suppression of Unlawful Seizure of Aircraft, 1970
Conventions concluded in the framework of the Hague Conference on Private International Law
Hague Civil Procedure Convention (1954)
Hague Convention Abolishing the Requirement of Legalisation for Foreign Public Documents (Apostille Convention), signed October 1961
Hague Service Convention, signed November 1965
Hague Evidence Convention, signed March 1970
Hague Convention on Foreign Judgments in Civil and Commercial Matters, signed February 1971
Hague Convention on the Civil Aspects of International Child Abduction, signed October 1980
Hague Convention on the Law Applicable to Trusts and on their Recognition, signed July 1985
Hague Adoption Convention, signed May 1993
Hague parental responsibility and the protection of children Convention, signed October 1996
Hague Choice of Court Convention, signed in 2005
Hague Securities Convention, signed July 2006
Hague Maintenance Convention, signed in 2007

See also
List of Hague Conventions on Private International Law
Hague Agreement (disambiguation)
Hague Tribunal (disambiguation)
Treaty of The Hague (disambiguation)